The Pănade is a right tributary of the river Târnava Mică in Romania. It discharges into the Târnava Mică in the village Pănade.

References

Rivers of Romania
Rivers of Alba County